Igrish-Halam or Igriš-Halab, was a king of the ancient city state of Ebla. His name means "(The god of) Halab has driven away (the opponent)", hence, the name might be a commemoration of an Eblaite victory that led to the incorporation of lands beyond the city of Halab. His reign was characterized by an Eblaite weakness, and tribute paying to the kingdom of Mari, with whom Ebla fought a long war. His battle with Iblul-Il of Mari at Sahiri was instrumental in this tribute payment.

He ruled for 12 years and was succeeded by his son Irkab-Damu who was a more vigorous ruler.

References

Citations

Bibliography

24th-century BC rulers
Kings of Ebla
24th-century BC people